Atanas Kabov (born 11 April 1999) is a Bulgarian footballer who plays as a winger for Septemvri Sofia.

Career
On 16 May 2017, Kabov made his first senior appearance for Levski, replacing Ivaylo Naydenov in 72nd minute as Levski lost 1-3 at home against Ludogorets Razgrad in the A Group.

In August 2017, Kabov joined Second League club Botev Vratsa on loan for the 2017–18 campaign.

On 28 January 2021 he moved from Slavia Sofia to Septemvri Sofia, signing a contract for an year and half.

Career statistics

Club

References

External links
 
 Profile at Levskisofia.info

1999 births
Living people
Bulgarian footballers
Bulgaria youth international footballers
Association football midfielders
First Professional Football League (Bulgaria) players
Second Professional Football League (Bulgaria) players
PFC Levski Sofia players
FC Botev Vratsa players
FC Tsarsko Selo Sofia players
FC Vitosha Bistritsa players
PFC Slavia Sofia players
Footballers from Plovdiv